New Chennai Greenfield International Airport is a proposed greenfield airport project to serve the city of Chennai, India. It will be built near Parandur of Kanchipuram district in the Indian state of Tamil Nadu. It will work alongside Chennai International Airport. The proposed airport will be spread around 5,000 acres. The Government of Tamil Nadu has declared that Tamil Nadu Industrial Development Corporation (TIDCO) will lead the project. The Airports Authority of India (AAI) conducted surveys on various areas near Chennai for a new airport for the city. Initially, a site near Sriperumbudur was fixed for the airport. But due to delays and cost of the land, the government decided to set the new airport in Parandur. The airport will also boost trade from Chennai and neighbouring districts as it will have its own dedicated cargo terminal, leading to a rapid increase in the economic development of the state.

The airport will be built on 4,970 acres of land. The distance between Chennai to Parandur is around 70 km, and from the existing airport is around 57 km, which takes around 1 hour 50 minutes to reach by road. AAI found two sites at Parandur and Pannur comparatively more feasible for development of airports. AAI has forwarded the pre-feasibility report to TNIDC, advising it to carry out Obstacle Limitation Surface (OLS) survey and charting work at the two identified sites. After comparing the viability and feasibility, including the presence of habitations and industrial establishments and the land acquisition cost of both the sites, the Government of Tamil Nadu confirmed the Parandur site as the location for development of the greenfield airport.

History 
The project was first proposed in 1998 by the then Minister of Civil Aviation, Ananth Kumar. He first gave the plan for the proposal of a new airport which would serve as an alternative to the existing airport at Chennai, which in the future would get constrained and will not be able to cope up with the future traffic.

Connectivity 

The airport will be linked via a spur road with the under-construction Bangalore–Chennai Expressway, and a proposed metro line of Chennai Metro, which will directly connect the city with the airport. Currently, the nearest railway station is the Tirumalpur railway station of the Chennai Suburban System, which is 10 km away from the airport.

Location 
The airport will be built on 4,970 acres of land, spread over 13 villages in Parandur, a small town located in Kanchipuram district. The distance between Chennai to Parandur is around 70 km, and from the existing airport is around 57 km, which takes around 1 hour 50 minutes to reach by road.

Land acquisition protests 
The people in the villages are against the project due to concerns of land loss leading to their loss of livelihood. The airport will be spread over 13 villages, where farming and fishing are the primary occupations of the people living in these villages. Farmers and fishermen have staged a walkout, and have said that they would vacate the land for the proposed airport only if they are allotted a plot of land, similar to the one they own at present, so that they could continue farming and fishing to sustain their livelihood.

Status updates 

 April 1998: The then Minister of Civil Aviation, Ananth Kumar, first gave the plan of proposal for the new international airport for Chennai.
 October 1998: The Tamil Nadu Industrial Development Corporation (TNIDC) identified a site for the airport 10 km south of Meenambakkam, which will be built in a Build-Own-Operate-and-Transfer (BOOT) Concept.
 November 1999: The Government of India cleared the proposal for the airport.
 November 2000: The airport's terminal was expected to come upon a 3,000 acre site likely in Porur, located west of Meenambakkam.
 May 2007: The then Chief Minister of Tamil Nadu, M. Karunanidhi, said more than 4,800 acres of land will be acquired for the airport in Sriperumbudur, which will have four runways.
 March 2012: As part of the document of Tamil Nadu's Vision 2023, the airport is planned to be built at a cost of ₹ 20,000 crore.
 January 2022: The Government of Tamil Nadu identified Padalam, Thiruporur, Pannur and Parandur as the possible sites for the airport.
 March 2022: After the pre-feasibility study and the inspection of the four possible sites identified by the Government of Tamil Nadu, the Airports Authority of India (AAI) shortlisted Parandur and Pannur as the sites for the proposed airport.
 August 2022: The Government of Tamil Nadu finalises and selected the site of the airport to be built at Parandur. The airport is expected to be completed by 2028.

See also 

 Chennai International Airport
 Airports Authority of India
 Tamil Nadu Industrial Development Corporation
 List of airlines of India
 Transport in Chennai
 Airports in India

References

Airports in Tamil Nadu
Proposed airports in Tamil Nadu